The FIBA Asia Champions Cup 2009 was the 20th staging of the FIBA Asia Champions Cup, the basketball club tournament of FIBA Asia. The tournament was held in Jakarta, Indonesia between May 12, 2009 and May 20.

Preliminary round

Group A

Group B

Knockout round

Championship

5th–8th places

Quarterfinals

Semifinals

Finals

Final standings

Awards
Most Valuable Player:  Jackson Vroman (Mahram)

References
Results on Goalzz.com

External links
fibaasia

2009
Champions Cup
Champions Cup
B